Louis Albert Auguste-Dormeuil (25 August 1868 in Croissy-sur-Seine – 8 October 1951 in Saint-Germain-en-Laye) was a French sailor who represented his country at the 1900 Summer Olympics in Meulan, France.

Further reading

References

External links

1871 births
1933 deaths
French male sailors (sport)
Sailors at the 1900 Summer Olympics – .5 to 1 ton
Sailors at the 1900 Summer Olympics – Open class
Olympic sailors of France
Sportspeople from Yvelines
Olympic gold medalists for France
Olympic medalists in sailing
Medalists at the 1900 Summer Olympics
20th-century French people